Caleb Zackery "Don" Toliver (born June 12, 1994) is an American rapper and singer-songwriter. He released his first major label mixtape, Donny Womack, in August 2018. He is known for his singles "No Idea" and "After Party", from his debut studio album, Heaven or Hell (2020), which gained popularity on the video-sharing app TikTok, as well as his August 2018 feature on fellow rapper and label-boss Travis Scott's song "Can't Say", from Scott's third studio album, Astroworld (2018). In August 2020, he was featured alongside Nav and Gunna on the song "Lemonade" by Internet Money, becoming his first top-10 hit on the Billboard Hot 100.

Early life 
Toliver was born and raised in Houston, Texas. He had no musical experience prior to releasing music in 2017. His father was a rapper during the Swishahouse movement in the early 2000s, and would commonly play music around him growing up.

Career

2017: Playa Familia and singles 
He released a collaborative mixtape, titled Playa Familia, with Yungjosh93. In late 2017, Toliver released the solo singles, "Diva" and "I Gotta". In March 2018, he signed to Atlantic Records and rapper Chedda Da Connect's record label We Run It Entertainment, in conjunction with Artist Partner Group. Also in early 2018, Toliver released "Make Sumn" and "Checks", with a music video.

2018–2020: Breakthrough, Cactus Jack and Heaven or Hell 
In July 2018, Toliver released the single "Holdin' Steel" featuring Dice Soho. The song was also accompanied by a music video. On August 2, Toliver released his major label debut mixtape, Donny Womack, along with a music video for the song "Diamonds".

The following day, on August 3, 2018, Travis Scott released his third studio album, Astroworld, on which Toliver was featured on the 13th track, "Can't Say". The single was later accompanied by a video that was sponsored by Yves Saint Laurent. On August 6, it was announced that Toliver had signed to Scott's Cactus Jack imprint label. Toliver appeared alongside Scott, Nav, Sheck Wes and Gunna in the music video for Nav’s single "Champion", which Scott was featured on. In September, his single "Diva" was later remixed by rapper Kevin Gates.

After his appearance on Astroworld, Toliver released several singles under the Cactus Jack label throughout 2019 including: "Back Up" featuring Wiz Khalifa, "Best You Had", "Can't Feel My Legs", and "No Idea". The song "No Idea" eventually became a viral sensation on social media/video sharing platform TikTok. In November 2019, Toliver accompanied Scott during the second Astroworld Festival. On December 13, Toliver released the music video for "Can't Feel My Legs". On December 27, Toliver along with other Cactus Jack members, known as JackBoys, released the compilation album JackBoys. Toliver, alongside Scott and Luxury Tax, contributed on the songs "Gang Gang" with Wes, "Had Enough" by Toliver featuring Quavo and Offset of the hip hop trio Migos, and "What to Do?" by JackBoys and Scott featuring Toliver.

On January 17, 2020, Toliver was featured on American rapper Eminem's eleventh studio album, Music to Be Murdered By, on the song "No Regrets". On February 21, Toliver was announced to open for The Weeknd's After Hours Tour alongside Sabrina Claudio.

On March 10, 2020, Toliver announced his debut studio album, Heaven or Hell, on social media and announced its release date. The album was released three days later on March 13 and features guest appearances from Travis Scott, Kaash Paige, Quavo, Offset, and Sheck Wes.

On May 8, 2020, Toliver was featured on Nav's song "Recap", from the latter's third studio album, Good Intentions.

On July 24, 2020, Toliver and his DJ Chase B released a collaborative single titled "Cafeteria", featuring Gunna, from their upcoming collaborative project, Escapism. Exactly one week later, on July 31, he released a song titled "Clap", for the soundtrack of the film F9, in which the soundtrack was released on the same day and the song became the seventh single.

On August 14, 2020, Toliver was featured alongside Nav on "Lemonade" by Internet Money and Gunna. The song earned him his highest-charting song on the Billboard Hot 100, eventually peaking at number 6 on the chart. On the same day, he was featured on Kaash Paige's song "Grammy Week", from her debut studio album, Teenage Fever. Exactly one week later, on August 21, he was featured alongside Big Sean on Nas' song "Replace Me", from his thirteenth studio album, King's Disease. On October 22, he was featured alongside Gucci Mane on Rico Nasty's single "Don't Like Me", from the latter's debut studio album, Nightmare Vacation.

2021-22: Life of a Don 
In February 2021, Toliver teased his next project, titled Life of a Don, on Twitter. On May 4, Toliver released the lead single, "What You Need". One month later on June 18, Toliver released the second single from the album, "Drugs N Hella Melodies", featuring his girlfriend, American singer Kali Uchis.

On August 20, 2021, Toliver released the single "Don't Go", a collaboration with American record producer Skrillex and Canadian singer Justin Bieber. On August 29, Toliver appeared on Kanye West's album Donda on the track "Moon", alongside Kid Cudi. On September 28, Toliver revealed the release date and cover art for Life of a Don. Life of a Don was released on October 8, 2021. The album included features from Travis Scott, Kali Uchis, SoFaygo, Baby Keem, and HVN. On February 24, Toliver appeared on a second track with West, "Broken Road" on the latter's album, Donda 2. On April 22, he appeared on Pusha T's song "Scrape It Off" from his album It's Almost Dry alongside Lil Uzi Vert. Exactly one week later, on April 29, he was featured on the single "Honest" by Justin Bieber and the two artists performed it live for the Justice World Tour in Houston the same day and two days later in Dallas. On August 26, 2022, he was featured on DJ Khaled's album God Did on the track "Lets Pray" along with Travis Scott. On September 9, he collaborated with Nav on the song "One Time" from his album Demons Protected by Angels featuring Future. On November 18, he released the single "Do It Right". On December 2, he was featured on the songs "Too Many Nights" (with Future), "Around Me", and "I Can't Save You (Interlude) (with Future)" on Metro Boomin's album "Heroes & Villains".

2023-present: Love Sick 
On February 14, 2023, Toliver announced his third studio album Love Sick. A single titled "4 Me" featuring Kali Uchis was released on February 15. On February 17, Toliver released the single "Leave the Club" featuring Lil Durk and GloRilla, and announced Lovesick will be released on February 24.

Four days later, he released the deluxe version, featuring four extra songs, including the featurings of Teezo Touchdown in "Luckily I'm Having" and label partner Travis Scott in "Embarassed".

Personal life 
He has been dating Colombian singer Kali Uchis since 2020.

Discography 

 Heaven or Hell (2020)
 Life of a Don (2021)
 Love Sick (2023)

Concert tours 

Headlining
 Life of a Don Tour (2021)

Supporting
 Future - One Big Party Tour (2023)

References

External links 

 

1994 births
Living people
21st-century African-American male singers
African-American male rappers
African-American male singer-songwriters
American contemporary R&B singers
American hip hop singers
Atlantic Records artists
Rappers from Houston
Singer-songwriters from Texas
Trap musicians